Aroga velocella is a moth of the family Gelechiidae. It is found in most of Europe, except for Ireland, Iceland and Croatia. Outside of Europe, it is found in Turkey, the Caucasus and Siberia (Transbaikalia).

The wingspan is 14–19 mm. Adults are on wing in May and again in August. There are two generations per year.

The larvae feed on Rumex acetosella. The larva feeds in a silken gallery at the base of the plant.

References

External links

UKmoths

Moths described in 1839
Aroga
Moths of Europe
Moths of Asia